The 2012 Labour Party leadership election was called to elect the new Leader of the Labour Party after incumbent Job Cohen announced his retirement from national politics. Cohen had been the leader of the party since 25 April 2010 after the resignation of Wouter Bos. Diederik Samsom a Member of the House of Representatives beat former Minister of Education, Culture and Science Ronald Plasterk, former Undersecretary for Justice Nebahat Albayrak, Member of the House of Representatives Martijn van Dam, and backbencher Member of the House of Representatives Lutz Jacobi with 54.0% of the votes.

References

Labour Party (Netherlands)
2012 elections in the Netherlands
Political party leadership elections in the Netherlands
Labour Party (Netherlands) leadership election